The Crystal Palace Line is a railway line in London which runs from Balham Junction to . The engineer's reference for this line is BBJ.

Route 
The line has a junction with the Portsmouth Line at Norwood, and again meets the Brighton Main Line, this time the line into , just beyond Crystal Palace.

History 

The first part of the line, between New Wandsworth and Crystal Palace (Low Level), opened 1 December 1856 as the West End of London and Crystal Palace Railway. In 1857 the route was extended to Norwood. On 3 May 1858 the company opened an extension from Bromley Junction (near Norwood Junction) to Shortlands railway station (then called Bromley) via Beckenham Junction station. The following year the original line from Pimlico to Norwood Junction was sold to the London Brighton and South Coast Railway, and the section from Bromley Junction to Shortlands to the London, Chatham and Dover Railway, but the WEL&CPR continued to provide its own passenger services. The two halves were reunited in 1921 as part of the Southern Railway following enactment of the Grouping Act.

Services 

These generally do not stop at any of the stations on the line.

References

Further reading 
 

Railway lines in London
Railway lines opened in 1856